William of Saint-Omer can refer to several members of the House of Saint Omer:

 William I of Saint-Omer, castellan of Saint Omer
 William II of Saint-Omer, castellan of Saint Omer
 William III of Saint-Omer, castellan of Saint Omer
 William IV of Saint-Omer (died 1191), castellan of Saint Omer
 William V of Saint-Omer (ca. 1170–1246), castellan of Saint Omer
 William VI of Saint-Omer, castellan of Saint Omer
 William VII of Saint-Omer, castellan of Saint Omer
 William of Saint-Omer (son of Nicholas I), Master of the Horse of Hungary
 William of Saint-Omer (son of Walter of Tiberias), Crusader noble